Erni is both a given name, often a short form of Ernest, and a surname. Notable people with the name include:

Given name or nickname
Erni Arneson (1917–2006), Danish actress
Erni Cabat (1914–1994), American artist
Erni Gregorčič (born 1976), Slovenian powerlifter
Erni Hiir (1900–1989), Estonian poet and translator
Erni Krusten (1900–1984), Estonian writer
Erni Maissen (born 1958), Swiss footballer
Erni Mangold, Austrian actress and stage director born Erna Goldmann (born 1927)
Erni Singerl, actress who played Erni Käslinger, one of the main characters of Heidi und Erni, a German 1990 television series

Surname
Barbara Erni (1743–1785), Liechtenstein thief, the last person to be executed by Liechtenstein
Hans Erni (1909–2015), Swiss graphic designer, painter, illustrator, engraver and sculptor
Lorenz Erni (born 1950), Swiss lawyer

See also
Ernie (disambiguation)

Estonian masculine given names
Hypocorisms
Lists of people by nickname